is a1991 memoir by Radha Rajagopal Sloss (b.1931). It chronicles aspects of the long, intimate, and ultimately contentious relationship of the author's family with the Indian philosopher Jiddu Krishnamurti.

About the work
The author's father Rajagopalacharya Desikacharya (commonly D. Rajagopal, 19001993), and mother Rosalind Rajagopal (19031996), were friends and associates of Jiddu Krishnamurti (18951986) for four decades; throughout this time they lived in close proximity with him in Ojai, California. While growing up, the author viewed the unconventional Indian philosopher, whom she affectionately called , as a member of her family. Eventually, the personal and business relationships of her parents and Krishnamurti soured permanently. The acrimony culminated in drawn-out legal actions that were fully settled only after Krishnamurti's death. 

Radha Rajagopal Sloss covers aspects of these relationships in some detail, but the book is best known for its descriptions of facets of Krishnamurti's private life, especially his long-term extramarital affair with the author's mother. Additionally, the book contains statements about Krishnamurti's character (and certain of his actions) that have generated controversy.

Author statement
Rajagopal Sloss stated the following regarding the work:

Publication history
A US edition was published by Addison-Wesley in  In  Rajagopal Sloss re-released the work through iUniverse, a US self-publishing company .

Select editions
Rajagopal Sloss, Radha (March 1993). Lives in the shadow with J. Krishnamurti (hardcover) (1st US ed.). Reading, Massachusetts: Addison-Wesley. .
 (September 2000). Lives in the shadow with J. Krishnamurti (paperback). Self-published.  via iUniverse.

Reception
The book has been favorably reviewed by Tim Heald in The Times (London), Patricia Beer (London Review of Books), and Firdaus Kanga in the Times Literary Supplement (London).

The revelations regarding the extramarital affair were met with surprise and consternation by Krishnamurti adherents, and generated a measure of adverse publicity. A Krishnamurti biographer wrote that "history will not view Krishnamurti in quite the same light", yet the same author considered the long-term impact of the revelations doubtful.

Several statements about Krishnamurti present in the work have been characterized as controversial, and provoked rebuttal publications by Krishnamurti associates and affiliated institutions. An independent source has described the book as "deliberately iconoclastic".

See also
List of works about Jiddu Krishnamurti
Rosalind Rajagopal

References

External links
 "The Shadow Side of Krishnamurti" Rajagopal Sloss interviewed in 1991 by Helen Tworkov for Tricycle: The Buddhist Review magazine.

1991 non-fiction books
Biographies (books)
Bloomsbury Publishing books
Jiddu Krishnamurti